The Men's 100 Freestyle event at the 10th FINA World Aquatics Championships swam on 23–24 July 2003 in Barcelona, Spain. Preliminary and Semifinal heats swam on July 23; while the Final swam on July 24.

Prior to the start of the event, the existing World (WR) and Championship (CR) records were:
WR: 47.84 by Pieter van den Hoogenband (Netherlands) swum on 19 September 2000 in Sydney, Australia
CR: 48.33 by Anthony Ervin (USA) swum on 27 July 2001 in Fukuoka, Japan

Results

Final

Semifinals

Preliminaries

References

Swimming at the 2003 World Aquatics Championships